The Icelandic National Road Championships are held annually by the Icelandic Cycling Union to decide the cycling champions in both the road race and time trial discipline, across various categories.

Men

Road race

Time trial

Women

References

National championships in Iceland
Cycling in Iceland